Cecilia Island is the ice-free southernmost island of the Aitcho group on the west side of English Strait in the South Shetland Islands, Antarctica.  Extending , surface area .  The area, visited by American and English sealers in the early 19th century, nowadays has become a popular tourist site frequented by Antarctic cruise ships.

The feature's name derives from 'Cecilias Straits' applied to English Strait by Captain John Davis after the shallop Cecilia, tender to his ship Huron that visited the South Shetlands in 1820–22.  It was from the Cecilia that the first landing on the Antarctic mainland was made at Hughes Bay on 7 February 1821.

Location

See also
 Aitcho Islands
 Composite Antarctic Gazetteer
 List of Antarctic islands south of 60° S
 SCAR
 South Shetland Islands
 Territorial claims in Antarctica

Map
 L.L. Ivanov et al. Antarctica: Livingston Island and Greenwich Island, South Shetland Islands. Scale 1:100000 topographic map. Sofia: Antarctic Place-names Commission of Bulgaria, 2005.

References

External links
 SCAR Composite Antarctic Gazetteer.

Islands of the South Shetland Islands
Tourism sites in Antarctica